Dorcadion minutum is a species of beetle in the family Cerambycidae. It was described by Gustav Kraatz in 1873. It was first found in Greece.

Subspecies
 Dorcadion minutum atticum Kraatz, 1873
 Dorcadion minutum mimarenarium Breuning, 1974
 Dorcadion minutum minutum Kraatz, 1873

References

minutum
Beetles described in 1873